Toktogul Dam is a hydroelectric and irrigation dam on the Naryn River in the Jalal-Abad Province of Kyrgyzstan. It is a part of the Naryn-Syr Darya cascade. It is named after Toktogul Satilganov.

The Toktogul Hydroelectric Station has installed capacity of 1,200 MW, which makes it the largest power plant in the country. It has four turbines with capacity of 300 MW each.

Toktogul Reservoir is the largest of the reservoirs on the path of the Naryn River, a northern tributary of the Syr Darya.

The city of Kara-Köl, south of the reservoir (downstream from its dam) housed the dam construction workers, and currently is home to the hydro power plant staff. The city of Toktogul is located north of the reservoir.

Environmental and Social Impact

The reservoir was created in 1976 after construction works on the dam were completed and the Kementub Valley was flooded. The reservoir flooded more than 26 thousand hectares of land, of which 21.2 thousand hectares of agricultural land, 26 communities including large settlement Toktogul were displaced and the main road through the region was re-routed. Archaeologists excavated barrows from Saka times before the sites were lost.

2009 crisis
Toktogul Reservoir had a critically low water level in 2009. A cold dry winter, combined with water sales to foreign countries as well as increased domestic demand left the reservoir at a fraction of its capacity. Electrical rationing had to be employed throughout the entire country with outages lasting up to 11 hours every day.

References

Dams in Kyrgyzstan
Hydroelectric power stations in Kyrgyzstan
Hydroelectric power stations built in the Soviet Union
Dams completed in 1974
Dams on the Naryn River
Gravity dams
Energy infrastructure completed in 1978